The 1986 Toronto Argonauts finished in first place in the East Division with a 10–8 record. They appeared in the Eastern playoffs.

Offseason

Regular season

Standings

Schedule

 † Canadian Football Hall of Fame Game

Postseason

Awards and honours

1986 CFL All-Stars

References

Toronto Argonauts seasons
1986 Canadian Football League season by team